The Collectors' Colosseum is a compilation album by Colosseum that was released in England in 1971.

Track listing
"Jumping off the Sun" - 3:40, originally recorded late in 1969, with Chris Farlowe's vocals overdubbed over Dave Clempson's originals. In addition, there are extra guitar overdubs by Clempson.
"Those about to Die" - 4:52, excerpt from their first LP
"I Can't Live Without You" – 4:15, recorded 1968
"Beware The Ides of March" - 5:53, from their first LP
"Walking in the Park" – 3:55, idem
"Bolero" – 5:29, recorded late in 1969
"Rope Ladder to the Moon" - 3:22, recorded late in 1969 and composed by Jack Bruce
"The Grass is Greener" - 7:37, recorded late in 1969

Personnel
 On tracks 2, 3, 4, and 5 : Jon Hiseman on drums, Dick Heckstall-Smith on saxes, Dave Greenslade on organ, Tony Reeves on bass, James Litherland on guitar & vocals.
 On tracks 6 and 8 : Jon Hiseman on drums, Dick Heckstall-Smith on saxes, Dave Greenslade on organ, Tony Reeves on bass, Dave Clempson on guitar & vocals.
 On track 1 : Jon Hiseman on drums, Dick Heckstall-Smith on saxes, Dave Greenslade on organ, Tony Reeves on bass, Dave Clempson on guitar & vocals, Chris Farlowe on vocals.

References

2000 compilation albums
Colosseum (band) compilation albums
Albums produced by Gerry Bron
Bronze Records compilation albums